The Blue Caftan is a 2022 Moroccan Arabic-language drama film directed by Maryam Touzani. It depicts a woman and her closeted gay husband, who run a caftan store in the medina of Salé, Morocco, and hire a young man as an apprentice. The film premiered in the Un Certain Regard section at the 2022 Cannes Film Festival.

The Moroccan Cinema Center (Centre cinématographique marocain) announced that The Blue Caftan had been chosen to represent Morocco in the 2023 Oscars shortlist in the "International Feature Film" category.

Cast
 Lubna Azabal as Mina
 Saleh Bakri as Halim
 Ayoub Missioui as Youssef

See also
 List of submissions to the 95th Academy Awards for Best International Feature Film
 List of Moroccan submissions for the Academy Award for Best International Feature Film

References

External links
 

2022 drama films
2022 films
2022 LGBT-related films
LGBT-related drama films
French drama films
Moroccan drama films
Belgian drama films
Danish drama films
French LGBT-related films
Belgian LGBT-related films
Danish LGBT-related films
2020s Arabic-language films
Gay-related films
Films set in Morocco
Films shot in Morocco
2020s French films